Henry Nein (June 7, 1860 – November 12, 1933) was an American railroad engineer and politician.

Born in Wenings, Germany, Nein emigrated with his parents to the United States in 1870 and settled in La Crosse, Wisconsin. He went to public school and then worked in the saw mails. Nein was a railroad engineer for the Chicago, Milwaukee & St. Paul Railroad. In 1923, Nein served in the Wisconsin State Assembly as a Republican. Nein died in La Crosse, Wisconsin from a long illness.

Notes

1860 births
1933 deaths
German emigrants to the United States
Politicians from La Crosse, Wisconsin
American railroad mechanical engineers
Republican Party members of the Wisconsin State Assembly